The North Carolina Miss Basketball honor recognizes the top girls’ high school senior basketball player in the state of North Carolina. The award is presented annually by the Charlotte Observer.

Award winners

Schools with multiple winners

See also
 North Carolina Mr. Basketball

References

Mr. and Miss Basketball awards
High school sports in North Carolina
Awards established in 1985
1985 establishments in North Carolina
Women's sports in North Carolina
Miss Basketball
Basketball players from North Carolina
Lists of American sportswomen
Miss Basketball